Moshe Gutman (sometimes spelled Guttmann) was a Jewish politician and Jewish activist who was a member  minister without portfolio in the short-lived independent Belarusian Democratic Republic (1918–1919).

In 1917 he was elected a member of the Ukrainian Central Rada. At the end of 1917 he was elected Member of the Executive Committee of the Belarusian National Council (temporary quasi-government of Belarus) as a representative of the Jewish minority.

Following the announcement of Belarus's independence in March 1918, he represented the Jewish minority in the Belarusian government. He also drafted the first constitution of the Belarusian People's Republic.

Government ministers of Belarus
Belarusian politicians
Belarusian Jews
Members of the Rada of the Belarusian Democratic Republic
Members of the Central Council of Ukraine
General Jewish Labour Bund politicians
Year of birth missing
Year of death missing